Bhoomi Trivedi is an Indian singer, known for her Hindi songs "Ram Chahe Leela" from Goliyon Ki Raasleela: Ram-Leela (2013),and Husn Parcham from Zero (2018) which resulted in several awards and Nominations.

Life and career 
Trivedi is hailed from a musical family in Vadodara of Gujarat. She started to learn music while she was in 8th grade. Her father is a Railways employee who is fond of singing and her mother is a folk singer who has her own music group. Her elder sister is an engineer and a trained Bharata Natyam dancer.

In 2007, Trivedi got selected from audition to perform in Indian Idol 3, however quit the show as she was suffering from jaundice. The following year she was again auditioned to perform in Indian Idol 4, but again had to quit the show since her aunt died because of breast cancer. She returned to the Indian Idol 5 where she ends up the competition as the Runner-up. In the audition she sang a mix of the Gujarati portion of the multi-lingual rap song, Blood Brothers, by Karmacy and Wannabe by Spice Girls.

Trivedi, began her Bollywood career with 2012 film Prem Mayee with the song "Bahne Dey". However, she rose to fame with her rendition in Sanjay Leela Bhansali's 2013 released film Goliyon Ki Raasleela: Ram-Leela, where she lent her voice for the song Ram Chahe Leela which was picturized on Priyanka Chopra. She was initially approached to pen Gujarati lyrics and sing that bit for a song arranged by Shail Hada when she was told that Bhansali was looking for a different voice to sing a song for his next film. The song was well received by the audience and critics, while reviewers praised Trivedi's rendition in the song. Other than Bollywood songs, she also had recorded for several Gujarati films including the song 'Vaagyo Re Dhol' from the national award-winning film Hellaro.

Bollywood discography

Bengali discography

Gujarati discography

Awards

References

External links
 
 

Living people
Bollywood playback singers
Indian women playback singers
People from Vadodara
1984 births
Women musicians from Gujarat
Singers from Gujarat
21st-century Indian singers
21st-century Indian women singers
Indian Idol participants